Arabella Country Estate, known simply as Arabella, is a residential estate with golf course and 5 star hotel located near the coastal town of Hermanus, Western Cape, South Africa. In 2014, the Peter Matkovich designed golf course was rated in the top-5 in the country by Golf Digest South Africa.

Arabella has hosted several professional golf tournaments, including the Nelson Mandela Invitational from 2000 to 2008. It has also been home to the Western Cape leg of the Vodacom Origins of Golf Tour, part of the Winter schedule of events on the Sunshine Tour.

References

External links

Golf clubs and courses in South Africa
Sports venues in the Western Cape